This article describes the tram types in Adelaide that have operated for the past  years: from early days when they undertook a major share of the public transport task before car ownership was well established; through the 49-year period when only one tram line operated; to the city's 21st-century tramways revival.

The three eras of Adelaide trams since 1878
The evolution of public and private transport in Adelaide has closely reflected the economic and social development of South Australia. Growth of the Adelaide conurbation also reflected the development of efficient public transport. Horse-drawn transport characterised the foundation years, but with industrial development and the growth of the suburbs the extension of tramway (and railway) networks was a feature of urban transport and development until the Second World War.

There have been three generations of trams over the  years since street vehicles first ran on steel (or iron) rails in Adelaide:

From then until 2006 only the 1929-vintage "Glenelg"  trams survived, running mostly off-street on the  line from Adelaide's centre to the beach.

Horse trams

Although they were owned by 11 companies, their designs were similar: extremely lightweight in construction and with minimal springing. However, even at an average speed of 8 kilometres per hour (5 miles per hour) they were a vast improvement on the speed and comfort of horse-drawn street carriages. Their light weight was reflected in horse trams that ran to Henley Beach not being fitted with an upper-deck canvas awning for fear that a sea breeze would blow the tram over, and by the practice followed when horse trams met while travelling in opposite directions on single track: the one with the fewer passengers, derailed by able-bodied males, was pulled out of the way to allow the other car to pass.

An Adelaide company, Duncan & Fraser Ltd of Franklin Street, assembled the city's first 20 horse-drawn trams manufactured (and dismantled for shipping) by the John Stephenson Company, New York City. The company that ordered them, the Adelaide & Suburban Tramway Company, manufactured horse trams in its own factory at Kensington from 1897.

Except in minor respects the trams' designs did not evolve during the 36 years in which they operated.

The South Australian government purchased the assets of almost all of the companies in 1907 and in December incorporated the Municipal Tramways Trust (MTT) to introduce an electrified system. While the electric lines were being built, the trust operated many of the acquired horse trams but in decreasing numbers, withdrawing horse tram services altogether in July 1914 in the City of Adelaide and, after delays caused by the war, in 1917 on the isolated Port Adelaide system.

A battery tram trialled in 1889

Adelaide's horse tram era was briefly punctuated by a technology that foreshadowed the direction in which public transport would be transformed around the world. In 1889 – eight years after the world's first commercially successful electric tram ran in Germany, and in the same year that Melbourne introduced overhead-powered electric trams – the Adelaide and Hindmarsh Tramway Company Limited conducted trials of a tram powered by Julien's Patent electric traction technology. It was a battery-powered tramcar, which was promoted as offering the advantages of electrical power without the cost of erecting overhead wires.

On 9 January 1889 the car, adapted from a double-deck horse car built by Adelaide coachbuilders Duncan & Fraser, made the first of several fast journeys to Henley Beach. The project ended the following year when the two proponents were killed in a railway level crossing accident. Adelaide had to wait another 20 years for electrification.

Electric trams
In total, 337 electric trams of 14 types have operated over Adelaide's tramways, which totalled a little more than  until 1958, when the street tramways were closed down, and which now total . During the 44 years between the inauguration of the first electric tram in 1909 and the delivery of the last tram in 1953 the Municipal Tramways Trust commissioned 313 of the first 12 electric tram types described in this article.

Details of the trams in the order of their introduction are in the following panel, expandable by clicking  [show].

Trams of the 20th century

The MTT's 100 inaugural trams were of two North American designs, manufactured by the J.G. Brill Company of Philadelphia and shipped for final assembly by Adelaide coachbuilders Duncan & Fraser, who subsequently built 20 more cars. Between 1910 and 1912 another Adelaide coachbuilder, A. Pengelly & Co. of Edwardstown, assembled 50 more Brill trams, bringing a total of tram constructions before the First World War to 170. 

In 1913 the MTT had developed its first design to meet the specific requirements of its own system. Eighty-four of these fast-loading "dropcentre" trams were to become the mainstay of the street network until it was closed in 1958. However, the constraints of the First World War delayed their construction until 1921. As a stopgap to meet demand from extended routes, 20 four-wheeled trams were built cheaply in 1918, to almost the same design as the first of the inaugural tram types. Four Brill lightweight trams were imported in 1925 to handle the lightly trafficked, isolated Port Adelaide system.

In 1929, twenty years after a false start, the Glenelg railway line was converted to electric operation. Since most of the line was in a private reservation, the MTT designed an interurban-style high-speed (for the time) end-loading saloon tram with power-operated doors and folding steps. Thirty of them, capable of running coupled together, were built hurriedly for the line's opening. Popularly known as "Glenelg" or "Bay" trams, they were to operate in revenue service for 77 years. An updated version of the Glenelg trams was designed in 1939, but post-war material shortages delayed the introduction of the first – and ultimately the only – car until 1953.

While the last tram was being built, a parliamentary select committee concluded a report into the MTT in June 1952. The South Australian government then replaced the local government councillors comprising most of the MTT board with its government officials and announced its intention to close all of Adelaide's tram services, to be replaced by buses. The last street tram operated on 22 November 1958, leaving only the Glenelg line and its unique trams to survive, on a route from Victoria Square, the geographic centre of Adelaide, to Moseley Square, Glenelg.

By 2006 the Glenelg trams had been in full-time operation for 77 years. These new trams were designated the 100 Series. By year's end the 1929-vintage trams had been largely phased out of normal revenue service (the last being in 2008), only running occasionally on special occasions. In 2009 the second series of new trams went into service as the 200 Series; more arrived in 2017, bringing the total number of trams on the system to 24.

Type A

On 9 March 1909, a balmy South Australian autumn day, many thousands turned out to see a procession of 14 trams going slowly along the thoroughfares of Adelaide and nearby eastern suburbs for the official opening of the city's electric tramway system. The leading cars had a central saloon compartment somewhat similar to that of a horse tram and a compartment with cross-bench seating at each end, open to the weather. The design was popular in southern California, where the climate is similar to Adelaide's for much of the year. Thus they were officially described as "four-wheeled, drop-ended 'California combination' cars" – the "combination" referring to the two types of accommodation.

Seventy of the inaugural order of 100 trams were built to this design. In 1923, when an alphabetical classification system was introduced, they were designated as Type A.

Seating capacity was 40 passengers (20 in the saloons and 10 each end on the open benches); a further 60 could be accommodated standing, giving a total crush load of 100. Capable of speeds up to 35 kmh (22 mph), the trams presented a vast improvement in schedules and comfort over the horse trams they replaced. It was not only the trams' design that made for a smoother ride: the tracks laid by the MTT to replace the horse tram tracks were built to very high specifications – and they were brand new. However, the huge overhang from the four-wheeled truck at both ends of the car, almost double the truck's wheelbase – caused oscillations at higher speeds.

All 70 were built in 1908 and 1909 by Adelaide coachbuilders Duncan & Fraser, incorporating running gear and electrical equipment sourced from the UK and the US. Duncan & Fraser had an established record building horse tram cars for the Adelaide & Suburban Tramway Company and both horse and electric trams for several operators in Melbourne, Ballarat, Bendigo, and Geelong. The company initially constructed the cars, and Type B cars, in the machinery building of the Jubilee Exhibition grounds. However, when the building was required by the Royal Agricultural and Horticultural Society of South Australia the work was moved to Hackney Depot, delaying construction of cars and preventing electric services from beginning on the planned date of 23 December 1908.

Type A trams were the work-horses of the newly opened lines, including those to Kensington, Marryatville, Maylands, Payneham, Walkerville, North Adelaide, Parkside, Unley and Hyde Park. Later they were relegated to the quieter routes such as Croydon and Port Adelaide as larger trams became available. They were gradually retired in the 1930s, only to come out of storage in 1941 on account of wartime petrol rationing, which boosted patronage. Fifty-eight (and four Type A1 cars) were configured in permanently coupled pairs: although both trams in a pair still needed a conductor to collect fares, the need for only one driver per pair reduced staffing needs by 25 per cent – an important economy during wartime labour shortages. The paired trams soon became nick-named "Bib and Bub" after characters created by renowned children's author May Gibbs. They stayed in service after the war as the Australian Government continued petrol rationing until 1950.
 
Although at the time the MTT was established air brakes were being installed on streetcars in the US since they are much faster in application and release and therefore safer than mechanical brakes, Type A trams were never fitted with them; neither were any trams built before 1920. For normal stopping the Adelaide trams had a handbrake, operated by the motorman manually winding a wheel in the cab, and electromagnetic track brakes, energised by power generated by the motors as the cars slowed down, for emergencies.

Three Type A cars were sold in 1936 to the State Electricity Commission of Victoria. The remainder were withdrawn from service by May 1952; many were sold for use as shacks.

The Tram Museum, St Kilda restored Type A cars 14 and 15 in a major project lasting 15 years. In April 2018 they underwent a test run as a coupled "Bib and Bub" set; they are expected to be in regular service in 2019.

For Types A1 and A2 trams, see the sections headed "Type B conversion to Type A1" and "Type B conversion to Type A2".

Type B

For the MTT's inaugural order in 1909, Duncan & Fraser built another 30 trams, of a US design different from that of the Type A. They too were four-wheeled cars but they lacked the closed saloon compartment of the Type A. All passengers were accommodated on cross-bench seats in one completely open compartment, which soon gave rise to the nickname, "toast racks". The trams carried 50 passengers seated and 50 standing for a crush load of 100, the same total as the Type A trams.

These vehicles, later designated Type B, were popular for summer trips to the beach and to concerts arranged by the MTT at Kensington Gardens, Henley Beach and Semaphore. However, only pull-down canvas blinds offered weather protection and they were inadequate for Adelaide's rainy winter months, which are cooler than in southern California. For that reason they were particularly unpopular with both passengers and conductors in inclement weather. Conductors were also exposed to danger in having to collect fares by walking along the often swaying footboards on the outside of the car.

Eventually 20 of the 30 Type B trams were modified to become "combination trams": a new central closed saloon compartment was built, leaving two facing cross-benches at each end. In 1923 seventeen were designated as Types A1 and 3 as A2. These are described in the next two sections. One "toastrack" was retained for use by the MTT band on the Port Adelaide system and in 1929 one was substantially converted for use during construction of the electrification infrastructure of the Glenelg tram line. 

Almost all Type B cars and those converted to Types A1 and A2 were withdrawn from service in 1936 and scrapped in 1946.

Type B conversions to Type A1

In 1917 the MTT responded to longstanding complaints by crews and passengers that Type B "toast rack" trams were unacceptable in wet or cold weather. Seventeen were converted by Duncan & Fraser (although it is possible that one of these was converted by the MTT) into "California combination" trams, halving the number of exposed seats in the process. This work was done after the Type B conversions to Type A2 had taken place. Under the alphabetical classification system of 1923 they were designated as Type A1.

After conversion the trams were similar to the existing Type A – a design also continued in the subsequent Type C cars. Seven were converted for the isolated Port Adelaide tram system operated by the MTT between 1917 and 1935. Type A1 cars were rated with the same passenger capacity (seated and crush load) as the Type A.

Four Type A1 trams were converted into permanently coupled "Bib and Bub" pairs, a wartime labour-saving configuration applied to most Type A cars. These four were the last of the Type A1 cars to be withdrawn from service in 1950, together with the sets of Type A trams not converted back into single car operation.

Type A1 is one of the two MTT tram sub-types not in the collection of the Tram Museum, St Kilda.

Type B conversions to Type A2

The three trams of this type were converted, like the A1, from the unpopular Type B "toast rack" trams, and similarly entered service on the Port Adelaide tram system in 1917. Work on the three cars was undertaken by the MTT at their Hackney workshops rather than by contractors. 
Rebuilding involved removing six cross-bench seats and their pillars from the centre of the car, then installing a heavily constructed saloon in their place. The trams were essentially the same as the Type A1, but easily distinguishable in having three large windows instead of five small arched ones, and heavy, riveted steel sides. This latter feature led to their nickname, "tanks", after the revolutionary British Army weapons newly deployed in the First World War.
 
The seating and standing capacity for these trams was the same as for Types A, A1 and C.

The Type A2 trams operated on the isolated Port Adelaide system until its closure in 1935, after which they were transferred to Hackney workshops. In 1946 the bodies of two were sold to private buyers. The third was kept at Hackney workshops until 1958, when it was made available to the Tramway Museum, St Kilda. The museum rebuilt it into its original Type B "toast rack" configuration in preference to retaining its A2 configuration. Consequently, Type A2 is the second of the two MTT tram sub-types not in the museum collection.

Type C

During World War 1 the MTT urgently needed more tramcars to handle increases in patronage and route extensions. However, wartime austerity made it impossible to proceed with a planned introduction of large trams. As an interim measure, 20 small combination cars similar to Type A were built by Duncan & Fraser in 1918–1919. These cars, subsequently designated Type C, had a more modern domed roof instead of a clerestory roof. During their construction they were fitted with motors removed from Type E trams. Rated at  each, two-thirds again higher than the  motors of the Type A, they enabled much faster acceleration. They soon became popularly known as Desert Gold trams, after a New Zealand racehorse that had won races in Australia at the same time. Their speed combined with the four-wheeled design gave rise to their other nickname, "bouncing billies". They helped the MTT's competition against unlicensed buses in the 1920s, and they were used in peak periods until 1952. Their last use was during the royal visit of March 1954.

Type D

In May 1909, soon after the opening of the first electric lines, it became evident that 100 cars would not be enough to meet traffic demand. In May 1909 the MTT called for tenders for trams it had designed which were much larger than the existing four-wheeled cars.

Local tenders were much higher in price than others and the Trust declined to accept them on commercial grounds. A Melbourne company, Noyes Brothers (Melbourne) Pty Ltd, eventually won the contract for 50 cars (later increased to 70). Their tender stated that the car bodies would be manufactured by the J.G. Brill Company in Philadelphia, erected there, dismantled and packed, and re-erected in Australia. Prompted by public opposition to work going out of the state, the MTT asked that assembly be in South Australia. Noyes Brothers then negotiated with Adelaide coachbuilders A. Pengelley & Co. to erect the bodies under their supervision at the same tendered price, reported in The Register as being £36,673 and 13 shillings. As with previous trams, running gear and electrical equipment were necessarily sourced from the UK and US.
 
The 70 trams, built between 1910 and 1912, could carry 154 passengers in total (54 seated and 100 standing). When 20 had been completed, a change was made to the design of the remaining 30 (subsequently increased to 50): sliding doors were fitted to enclose each row of bench seats to give for protection from inclement weather. These trams came to be designated as Type D ("closed combination metropolitan bogie cars"); the first 20 became Type E.
 
The design of these larger cars featured maximum traction trucks, recognisable by one pair of wheels being much smaller in diameter (508 mm or 20 inches) than the other (838 mm or 33 inches, the same diameter as on the earlier types). The driving axle, with large wheels, was driven; the other was not. By locating the truck pivot off-centre, more weight rested on the driving axle, providing greater traction. The smaller wheels guided the truck on the rails, bearing a relatively small portion of the weight.

A further four almost identical trams, which Duncan & Fraser had built in 1912 for tramways trusts in Melbourne, were acquired by the MTT in 1927 and incorporated into the D fleet.

Since there was no means of moving along the tram inside the cross-bench area, conductors had to make their way along the external footboards to collect fares while the tram was in motion – a task even more dangerous in cold or rainy weather when the sliding doors had to be opened. In 1934, after conductors had been injured while collecting fares, a centre aisle was cut through the centre bulkhead and through four of the six cross-bench seats of these trams.

The Type D trams operated in regular service until the street network was closed in 1958.

Type E

Of the seventy-car "combination metropolitan bogie cars" ordered from A. Pengelly & Co. in 1910, the first twenty (as Type E) were very similar to the Type D but the open section had only roller blinds to protect passengers from bad weather. Continuous crossbench seats required the conductor to collect fares from the footboard. The Type E trams had the same passenger load rating as the Type D: 54 seated and 100 standing. The trams were especially popular for taking families to picnics at Burnside and Magill at a charge of 24 shillings ($A2.20) for the whole group.

Local opinion was strongly opposed to building new trams outside of South Australia. Consequently, Type E trams were built by the J.G. Brill Company in Philadelphia, then imported in parts and assembled by Pengelly from 1910 to 1912. As before, mechanical and electrical components were sourced from the UK and US.

In 1918, all Type E cars were fitted with 65 hp traction motors, replacing motors rated at 50 hp.

During 1936 the open area on all Type E cars was enclosed by an extended saloon. The converted cars were designated Type E1.

Some Type E trams survived in revenue service until the close of street tram operation in 1958.

Type E conversions to Type E1

By the mid-1930s, more than half of the MTT's cars were almost 30 years old. The enormous financial stringencies of the Great Depression prevented the construction of new cars, but improvements were made to older cars at the MTT's workshops. The conversion of all Type E trams to Type E1 involved removing the crossbenches and extending the saloon for the entire car length except for one retained cross-bench seat behind the motorman's bulkhead. The original (non-smoking) saloon received new upholstered seating; the removed timber saloon seats were transferred to the new saloon.

The converted trams were immediately unpopular because there was only one small door at each end, making them difficult to board in rush hours. However, enclosing the open section eliminated the severe safety hazard that external footboards posed to conductors.

Type F and its variant F1

At last released from the severe constraints of the First World War, the MTT's chief engineer and general manager W.G.T. Goodman designed a new "dropcentre" tram that could be loaded and unloaded very quickly by six lines of passengers. They entered or left the tram's open section, which had a lower floor than the enclosed saloons on either side, made possible by more modern running gear that took up less space.

These Type F trams and their variant Type F1 seated 60 and had standing room for a further 110, totalling a crush load of 170 passengers, two-thirds more than all but one of their predecessor types. They were a highly popular design, providing much more space and comfort than previous MTT trams. Their acceleration and braking was significantly better than their predecessors' on account of a 40-hp traction motor on each of the four axles (on which all wheels were the same  diameter), and air brakes (the first to be fitted from inception).

A total of 84 were built, making them the most common trams used in Adelaide.  Local coach builders A. Pengelly & Co. built the initial 50 cars in 1921–22, a further 11 of almost identical design (designated Type F1) in 1925, and 20 more F1 cars in 1928. The MTT built one Type F1 in 1927 and two more in 1929. The main difference between the two types lay in the construction of the underframe: the Type F cars combined steel and timber-frame construction whereas the Type F1 cars had an all-steel underframe. With so many trams of these types in service, many detail variations occurred in the fleet.

In 1929, two cars were fitted with additional air brake pipes to haul an unusual type of trailer –  horse transport cars – on the Glenelg line between Adelaide and Morphettville Racecourse.

From October 1953, about half the trams in the Type F and F1 fleet were repainted from their tuscan-red and cream livery into silver and carnation red. Most of the repainted cars – and a few that were not repainted – had an emergency exit door fitted behind the motorman's compartment, reducing the seating capacity in these trams from 60 to 56.

Whether a passenger sat "inside" or not was governed by a strict custom. As John Radcliffe and Christopher Steele observed:These cars were important in the development of an unusual custom by passengers of practising the de facto segregation of the sexes. The habit was quite without legal foundation, yet it was a custom firmly entrenched until the trams were replaced by buses. Passengers who sat in the wrong compartments were regarded as something in the nature of "social outcasts" by their fellow passengers. Men always occupied the centre (smoking) section of "dropcentre" cars, while women and children occupied the end saloons. Even married couples invariably split up after boarding the car. Father always purchased the tickets from the conductor as he passed through the centre of the car. When the conductor reached the end saloon, Mother would point out, amid much arm waving, which of the male passengers outside was her husband. Inspectors who periodically boarded the cars to check that everyone had tickets consequently had a difficult time. 

The dropcentre cars had the leading role over the entire Adelaide street tram network for 37 years until the system, with the exception of the Glenelg line, was shut down on 22 November 1958. They were especially well suited to carry the crowds associated with race meetings, football matches and the agricultural show at the Wayville Showground.

The fate of the street trams was the final consequence of many factors at work, including the fact that the number of cars registered in South Australia increased from 100,000 in 1946 to 240,000 in 1956, while during the same time the number of riders carried by all forms of public road passenger transport in Adelaide dropped from 100 million to 60 million.

More information about the closure of the street network is in the article Municipal Tramways Trust.

Type G

Four Type G cars were built by the J.G. Brill Company in Philadelphia in 1924 and were placed in service in 1925. They were the company's standard "Birney safety car" – named after their designer, Charles Birney – that had become popular on lightly trafficked lines in the US. They incorporated several safety features and used little power, but owing to their small wheelbase were said to ride "like a rowboat out to sea".
The trams filled a niche demand for economic operation over the lightly patronised Port Adelaide system,  carrying only 50 passengers. They incorporated folding doors and steps and several safety features, and used little power, but due to their small wheelbase tended to "ride like a rowboat out to sea". They were the only trams in Adelaide able to be operated by the driver alone, doing away with the need for a conductor. Until the arrival of the 100 Series Flexity and 200 Series Citadis trams more than 80 years later, they were also the only trams in Adelaide to be entirely constructed overseas.

The Type G trams ran for 10 years before the Port Adelaide system was closed in 1935. The following year, the four were sold to the State Electricity Commission of Victoria for use in Geelong, joining two other, new, Birney cars. In 1947 the Commission transferred the four former Adelaide cars to its Bendigo tramways, to be followed by the remaining two in 1949. There, the trams were in revenue service until 1972 when the system was closed down.

Type H (later, 300 Series)

In 1929, fortuitously just before the onset of the Great Depression, the MTT acquired the 56-year-old steam-hauled double-track South Terrace railway from the South Australian Railways. It was to be electrified with overhead catenary at 600 volts direct current. By December of that year the track had been refurbished and gauge-converted, a flyover bridge built over the railway to Melbourne at Goodwood, and electrification infrastructure installed. 

To provide a fast service on the  line between Adelaide and the beachside suburb of Glenelg – 85% of it in an exclusive corridor – 30 long, fully enclosed end-loading saloon cars were designed and built. They were in everyday service for 70 years after they entered service in December 1929.

North American influence
The construction of the Glenelg tramway and its rolling stock was probably MTT chief engineer and general manager W.G.T. Goodman's greatest achievement. Though Goodman was an Englishman by birth, education and early professional experience, many of his ideas reflected a strong North American influence. In terms of rolling stock design it was evident not only in the Type H cars but also in the stock US streetcar designs, both in layout and detail, that he favoured in 1908–1912 for the inaugural Adelaide street tram system and in his 1918 design (not built) for fast-loading street trams. The design of the Type H was typical of many hundreds of interurban cars operating in North America at the time.  The term "interurban" was applied to vehicles heavier and faster than urban trams ("streetcars" in North America), operating in city streets and on private right-of-way between built-up areas. Goodman had proposed a similar design for electrification of the line twenty years earlier, but the electrification bill introduced into the South Australian Parliament was defeated, as was a similar bill two years later.

A memorable experience
 

To the travelling public the trams became known by their destination as "Glenelg" and "Bay" trams (after Holdfast Bay, on which Glenelg is located). They were very popular from the beginning; a journey on a "Bay" tram gave the traveller a comfortable experience of 1920s technology that with the passing of the years became more memorable. Brian Andrews recalled his childhood journeys in City and Glenelg:Boarding the big red car ... my mother and I would settle into a comfortable leather seat in the non-smoking saloon as the "connie" (conductor) walked through the tram, throwing over pairs of reversible seats with both hands, with a "kalunkada kalunkada kalunkada". Then, with a sharp hiss of escaping air and a "klunk" the folding doors would close and the steps fold up against the side of the tram, and with a slight jerk we would be off. The journey would be punctuated by the sound of the push-button buzzers actuated by passengers wishing to alight at the next stop, the blare of the hooter as the tram approached level crossings and the occasional "dugga dugga dugga" sounding mysteriously from beneath the floor as the air compressor cut in to restore air pressure for the brakes and control system.

Construction
The car bodies were manufactured by A. Pengelly & Co. of the Adelaide suburb of Edwardstown – a company that had built trams for the street network since 1910 – for £5,000 each.  Steel undergear components and electrical equipment were sourced separately from the UK and US; the compensating-beam truck frames were supplied by the Australian agents of the Commonwealth Steel Company of Illinois and the rest of the truck was built by the MTT's Hackney workshops.

The body, s) long, had tapered ends and a width slightly less than other trams to allow them to clear corners in streets, such as when going into depots or on suburban street lines: although designed specifically for the Glenelg line, they also saw service on the street tramway routes to Henley North, Kensington Gardens and Cheltenham. Air-powered double doors and bottom steps permitted quick loading at each end. From the entry vestibule, a step up led to a saloon with reversible leather seats, with a mid-car, full-height partition, originally to separate smokers and non-smokers. Their capabilities included multiple-unit operation (up to three cars but limited to two after a major accident in 1937), automatic acceleration and remote electro-pneumatic control, interconnected by the electrical and compressed-air connections on automatic Tomlinson couplers. After a few years in service, the trams were also fitted with air horns.

A design shortcoming

North American streetcars and interurbans had evolved from all-wood construction early in the 20th century through composite wood-and-steel to heavyweight steel (about 1909) and to lightweight steel in the 1920s. All-steel construction reduced maintenance and potential loss of life inherent in a collision in which a steel underframe scythed through the wooden body of an opposing car. Although four years earlier the MTT had imported Birney safety cars from the J.G. Brill Company built of lightweight steel, and despite the higher-than-normal speed of the Type H trams, the MTT did not incorporate this inexpensive feature in its design. Many Glenelg line collisions, particularly at level crossings, required substantial repairs, confirming their vulnerability.

Modifications and refurbishing
During the 1930s, five trams' trolley poles were replaced experimentally with pantographs, each of a different pattern.  However, the overhead wires at the time, although suspended in a catenary system, were configured near the centreline of the tram rather than being "zig-zagged" (staggered from one side to the other), which is essential to ensure the wire can "wipe" back and forth along the pantograph to prevent grooves forming. All pantographs in the experiment wore unevenly, so further work was discontinued.

The whole fleet was re-motored in 1956 with slightly more powerful  motor originally intended for the unrealised H1 fleet. Replacement air horns were installed; gongs remained.

In 1986, when operations were transferred from the Angas Street (City) depot to the new Glengowrie depot on the Glenelg line and the overhead wiring was re-engineered (including rigging the wire to "zig-zag"), 11 out of the 21 surviving cars were fitted with pantographs and all 21 had roller bearings fitted to their trucks. Ten of the cars underwent their first-ever major refurbishment at the State Transport Authority's workshops, based at the time in Regency Park.

In 2001 and 2002, some Type H cars were modernised, asbestos was removed and electronic inverter controls replaced the original control gear. Five cars were given a complete rebuild.

In 2005 all remaining cars were modified so they could operate past the upgraded passenger platforms built in readiness for new 100 Series Flexity Classic trams, which would be narrower.

Liveries
When introduced in 1929, the cars received a varnished tuscan-red  and deep cream livery, with varnished wood interiors and black undergear, as for other Adelaide trams. Between 1952 and 1956 the livery of all Type H cars was changed to silver and carnation red and an Ashbury green interior. In 1959 and 1960, two cars were painted in a short-lived experimental grey and carnation red livery, and in 1971 two others received the same livery but with a "railway" red roof to overcome the problem of silver roofs soon appearing dirty; the idea was not adopted. All silver trams were returned to their original external and internal livery starting in 1971, when 18 cars were extensively refurbished.

Some cars received liveries different from the two mentioned. In 1979 car 377 was repainted with a black-and-gold livery to celebrate the 50th anniversary of tramway operation on the Glenelg line, which it retained for a few years. Car 380 was also briefly repainted in 1979 into a special livery by students in the Glenelg area as part of a South Australian schools festival. Car 378 gained a grey-roofed, royal blue, gold-lined livery in 1990 when it became a restaurant car.

Change to numerical classification
In 2006, when the first of the new trams purchased for Adelaide's tramways revival began operation, a numerical "series" classification replaced the old alphabetical system. From then until they ceased running in 2015, Type H trams were designated as the 300 Series, which conveniently accorded with their existing numbers.

Withdrawal
The first withdrawal from service of Type H cars occurred in the late 1950s; by 1968 the fleet consisted of 26 cars.
In September 2005, tenders were called for the sale and removal of 16 cars: ten operational; restaurant car 378; and five non-operational. Organisations such as museums with heritage experience could seek a tram as a gift or at minimum value. Their subsequent uses were as varied as a restaurant, an attraction at a bed-and-breakfast venue, a tourism display at Glenelg, and a media studies classroom in a Riverland high school.

In 2006, a transitional period started in which the cars were progressively withdrawn as new Flexity Classic trams arrived. Most were withdrawn by 2007; the final revenue service on the Glenelg Line was in 2008, by which time the cars were 79 years old. Five of them were retained at Glengowrie depot to operate a weekend "heritage tram" service and charter trips, the last of which occurred in 2015. They were acquired by tramways museums, where  most were operable.

Type H1

When Adelaide's street tramways were closed in 1958, Type H1 car 381 was the most modern of the MTT fleet. It was the first of a projected order of 40 cars originally planned in 1939. However, the Second World War intervened, and post-war material shortages delayed construction until the 1950s. Built by Adelaide bus manufacturer J.A. Lawton & Sons as one of two prototypes, no. 381 was essentially a streamlined, all-steel version of the Type H with many constructional features of buses and one pair of doors in the middle of the tram instead of at the end. Although it captured the public's imagination, commonly being known as "the streamliner", it incorporated only marginal improvements over the Type H. It was introduced in January 1953 and for most of its short operational life it ran on the through-routed Kensington and Henley North lines.

In 1953, however, time was running out for Adelaide's trams. By February 1950 petrol rationing had ended and families aspired to buy motor cars; patronage on public transport had dropped from 95 million in 1946 to 78 million in 1951. In 1951 the lower house of the parliament of South Australia appointed a select committee to investigate the MTT following a forecast that in June 1952, for the first time since its inception, the trust would be unable to meet its financial obligations without assistance. in February 1952 the committee issued its interim findings criticising many of the operations of the trust, including a failure to plan for the future. Eleven months later, in the same month that the H1 car was introduced, the MTT board, which since 1907 had comprised mainly municipal council appointees, was reconstituted with a new board of state government appointees. The board initiated a complete re-examination of the transport system, and plans were made to replace all the existing tramways, including the Glenelg line, with bus operation.

Thus tram 381 became one of a kind; a partly constructed 382 was scrapped. It was withdrawn from revenue service in December 1957 and donated to the Tramway Museum, St Kilda in 1965, where it is operational. It spent only five years in revenue service but has spent  years in preservation.

Trams of the 21st century

100 Series (Bombardier Flexity Classic)

Adelaide's tramway revival, which was first seen in the 2005 upgrading of the Glenelg tram line, continued with a $58 million investment in the first vehicles of a modern tram fleet. Starting in January 2006, eleven Bombardier Flexity Classic vehicles began operation, progressively replacing the Type H trams, by then 77 years old. 
Bombardier had won the supply tender against one other bidder, receiving an initial order for nine trams in September 2004. The company was able to effect unusually quick delivery by supplying them on the back of a large order under way for VGF, the Frankfurt Transport Company.

Built in Bautzen, Germany, the trams are s) long, articulated in three segments, with low floor height for 70 per cent of the vehicle. Bombardier emphasises the technically mature, tried-and-tested standard elements of the Classic range (one of four main product groups), the light-weight welded steel construction which enables repair works at the transport authority's own workshops, and conventional wheel-set bogies to maximise the quality of ride and reduce wheel wear.

Several of the earlier Flexity cars were unloaded at Adelaide's Outer Harbor; later deliveries were first shipped to Melbourne and offloaded there before being hauled by road to Adelaide.

Initially the trams' air conditioning systems, built for the Hamburg climate, failed to cope with Adelaide's high summer temperatures, but they were rectified by engineering changes in 2007.

Another two Flexity trams were ordered in time for the Victoria Square to City West route extension to Adelaide railway station that opened in October 2007. By 2008 the state government was reported to be considering the unusual step of lengthening the trams, instead of purchasing more, to accommodate increasing passenger numbers. However, an order was placed with Bombardier in September 2008 for an additional four trams for the route extension from North Terrace to the Adelaide Entertainment Centre.

With the introduction of the Flexity Classic, the Department of Planning, Transport and Infrastructure changed the MTT's alphabetical classification of tram types to a numeric system, and the Flexity Classics became the 100 Series. In informal parlance they are generally referred to as "Flexities".

200 Series (Alstom Citadis 302) 

The Citadis 302 is one model in a range of low-floor trams and light rail vehicles built by Alstom. , more than 2,500 Citadis trams have been sold to operators in more than 50 cities in 20 countries, conveying 4 million passengers per day. Alstom claims the Citadis's energy cost is one-quarter that of buses and one-tenth of cars. Most Citadis vehicles are made in Alstom's factories in La Rochelle, Reichshoffen and Valenciennes in France; in Barcelona, Spain (as in the case of Adelaide's 200 Series trams); and Annaba, Algeria.

Alstom built the first of what became Adelaide's 200 Series trams as part of an order of 70 Citadis model 302 units from Spanish operator Metro Ligero for service in Madrid. A scaling down of plans as a result of the worldwide financial crisis resulted in a number of them being placed into storage, "as new", immediately after delivery. TransAdelaide, needing to meet demand on the new line to the Adelaide Entertainment Centre, subsequently acquired six and shipped them to Australia.

Alstom ran one as a demonstrator for two weeks in Melbourne after landing; before delivery to Madrid the company had used one in Stockholm to test a route extension.

Before arriving in Adelaide the six trams were modified at the Preston Workshops heavy maintenance facility in Melbourne.

A further three trams arrived in December 2017 to meet expected demand from expansion of lines in eastern North Terrace and King William Road.

Compared to the 100 Series Flexity Classic trams, the 200 Series trams have a higher crush load (186 passengers compared with 115) but 10 fewer seats; low floors for 100 per cent of the passenger space; and are formed of five articulated sections rather than three. They are   ins) longer than the 100 Series. In informal parlance they are generally referred to as "Citadis".

Preserved Adelaide trams
Several museums, preservation groups and other entities have Adelaide trams that are accessible for rides or on static display. Most of them are operational, running when rostered along  of purpose-built track that runs between the museum and a large adventure playground.

For details of the preserved trams, click  [show] in the following panel.

Links to articles about Adelaide tramways, from the horse tram era to the contemporary era of tramways revival, are accessible in the panel at the beginning of this article: click  [show] to open it.

Notes

References

Tram transport in South Australia
Adelaide
Transport in Adelaide
Adelaide